The K-30 truck, a US Signal Corps designation for an Autocar U8144 truck with York-Hoover van body, was used as the Operating Truck for the SCR-270, an early-warning radar of World War II.
2) 3) 4) Similar vehicles were the K-31 power truck for the SCR-270 early warning radar and K-62 or K-62-A, both operating trucks also for the SCR-270. K-30 and the similar K-62(-A) differed in cubic feet and overall height from the K-31.
On the accompanying image in the infobox can be seen, that the K-30 beside in cubic feet and overall height differed from the K-31 in having a window on the right side of the van body.
The panels at the back and at both sides were formed by two halves, that were folded up and down respectively.
This truck contains a high-power radio transmitter, a cooling system for the transmitter tubes, two cathode-ray oscilloscopes (one carried as a spare), two superheterodyne receivers (one spare), a vacuum-tube keyer, a plotting table, and containers for spare parts and tubes.

Gallery

See also
List of US Signal Corps vehicles
List of U.S. military vehicles by supply number
Autocar U8144T
K-31 power truck
SCR-270 Radar

Notes

2)FM 11-25
3)TM 11-1410
4)TM 11-1540
5)FM-25 1942 pg.24,25

References
 TM 9-817
 TM 9-1817
 ORD 7 SNL G-511, 1949
 ORD 7 SNL G-511, 1952
 ORD 8 SNL G-511, 1952
 ORD 9 SNL G-511, 1945
FM 11–25
TM 11-1510
TM 11-1410
TM 9-2800, 1943

Military trucks of the United States
Military vehicles introduced from 1940 to 1944
Soft-skinned vehicles
World War II military vehicles
World War II vehicles of the United States
Motor vehicles manufactured in the United States